Delta Sigma may refer to:

 Delta Sigma fraternity, a secondary school fraternity founded in 1897 at Lewis Institute in Chicago, Illinois
 Delta Sigma (sorority), a collegiate sorority founded in 1895 at Tufts University and later absorbed by Alpha Omicron Pi
 Delta-sigma modulation, a pulse density modulation scheme used in analog-to-digital and digital-to-analog conversions